Viljandi Airfield (ICAO: EEVI) is an airfield in Viljandi, Estonia.

The airfield's owner is NGO Viljandi Lennuklubi.

References

Airports in Estonia
Buildings and structures in Viljandi County
Viljandi